Nastassia Kiptsikava (born 10 August 1999) is a Belarusian professional racing cyclist, who currently rides for UCI Women's Continental Team .

References

External links

1999 births
Living people
Belarusian female cyclists
Place of birth missing (living people)
21st-century Belarusian women